= The Librarian's Guide to Homelessness =

Book by Ryan Dowd

The Librarian's Guide to Homelessness: An Empathy-Driven Approach to Solving Problems, Preventing Conflict, and Serving Everyone
- Author: Ryan Dowd
- Language: English
- Subject: homelessness in libraries
- Publisher: ALA Editions
- Publication date: January 12, 2018
- Pages: 264
- ISBN: 978-0-8389-1626-1

The Librarian's Guide to Homelessness is a 2018 book by Ryan Dowd that examines homelessness in libraries. Published by ALA Editions, it has been reviewed in several publications.
